Berg Orchestra (in Czech, Orchestr Berg), initially formed as a group of like-minded music students in 1995 and officially founded in 2001 by Slovak conductor Peter Vrábel, is a professional orchestra in Prague, Czech Republic whose stated objective is "to constantly search for inspiration and accommodate new impulses from every sphere of contemporary life."

Aside from its performances in traditional concert halls, Berg performs in museums and sewage treatment facilities, on theater stages, in churches and synagogues, and sometimes accompanies silent film screenings or dance performances. The orchestra’s director Eva Kesslová says choosing the spaces for the performances is an important aspect of their work.

History
Vrábel launched his concert career early, collaborating as a student with numerous symphony and chamber orchestras, as well as with Kühn's Children Choir. In 1995 he founded Berg Orchestra as a means of promoting new music, actively collaborating with Czech composers, and creating opportunities for the younger generation of composers and performers through various projects. Berg's enterprises are diverse—despite its concentration on new music, the orchestra also programs older works and is thus occupied with period interpretation. Berg has produced many recordings for Czech Radio and also proven its versatility with jazz and film music.

When Berg held its first season as an independent chamber orchestra in January 2001, the organizers were well acquainted with what they faced. "The music scene could be described as post-socialist," says Vrabel, who became Berg's conductor and artistic director. "Audiences rejected anything that was a bit more avant-garde, and many musicians looked at contemporary music with total disrespect. We had to learn how to live in freedom."

Concomitantly, Vrábel is a guest conductor at the National Theater in Prague.

Collaborations
Collaboration is central to Berg Orchestra. International composers with whom the orchestra has closely worked include Heiner Goebbels, Fausto Romitelli, Lera Auerbach and many others, along with such renowned Czech figures as Marek Kopelent and Martin Klusák. The orchestra enjoys a longstanding collaborative association with the Spitfire dance theatre company. In 2018, Berg Orchestra collaborated on the world premiere of the Tiger Lillies' Bohemian Nights show in Prague.

Films
In 2009, at the Spanish Synagogue in Prague, Berg premiered Jan Dušek's incidental music for E. Mason Hopper's 1922 silent film Hungry Hearts.

Nuberg Award
The Nuberg competition, established in 2006, selects winners from among the newly composed work commissioned by the orchestra during the previous year. Given the short lifespan of individual concerts, it is another means of providing young composers with valuable and generally hard-to-find exposure.
The competition gives out one Nuberg Award per year. The jury consists of distinguished figures from the international contemporary music world who, according to Vrábel, are entirely from outside the Czech Republic, and not only for the objectivity they provide. "It’s also for the young composers to have feedback from the international music scene," he told Česká pozice.

Outside awards and recognition
Peter Vrábel is a Gideon Klein Prize holder. In 2010, Vrábel and Berg Orchestra were commended for artistic excellence and the promotion of Czech music by the Czech section of the International Music Council of UNESCO.

References

Further reading
 Matz, M., "Two Composers on Two Strings", Opus Osm, 2013.
 Volynsky, M., "Raketon - a myriad of sounds on two strings", Radio Prague, Aug 26, 2014.
 Studený, I., "Signatura Berg - šest stop komorního orchestru", Czech Radio, Jan 18, 2016.
 Jiroušek, M., "Svatováclavský hudební festival uvidí němý film, hudbu zahraje orchestr", iDNES.cz, Sep 16, 2015.
 Havlíková, H., "Splněný slib Orchestru Berg i ostravská premiéra Donizettiho opery Robert Devereux", Lidové noviny, Dec 15, 2015.

External links

 Official website
 Fliegerová, A. R., "A Hundred Metronomes"—Berg Orchestra performances and interviews (vid.), Česká televize, Dec 12, 2014.
 Czech Museum of Music, Premiere of Jan Šikl's On Meaning of Things (vid.), Jun 11, 2012.
 Sander, F., Berg Orchestra concert at Petřiny Metro Station, Prague (vid.), Vimeo, May 5, 2014.

Musical groups from Prague
Musical groups established in 1995
Contemporary classical music ensembles
Czech orchestras
1995 establishments in the Czech Republic